Välgita is a village in Viljandi Parish, Viljandi County, Estonia. It has a population of 116 (as of 1 January 2010).

Välgita is the location of OÜ Valge VN, producer of solid timber products.

External links
OÜ Valge VN, timber producer located in Välgita

References

Villages in Viljandi County
Kreis Fellin